The 13th Hollywood Music in Media Awards recognized the best in music in film, TV, video games, commercials, and trailers. The ceremony was held on November 16, 2022 at The Avalon in Hollywood, Los Angeles, becoming the first in-person ceremony in two years after the virtual ceremonies of 2020 and 2021.

Composer Kurt Farquhar received the Career Achievement Award. The nominations were announced on November 3, 2022; new categories for songs and score for trailers and streaming media were introduced.

Winners and nominees

Score

Song

Music Supervision

Other

Music genre (Independent)

References

External links
 Official website

Hollywood Music in Media Awards
2022 television awards
2022 music awards
H